The Imjin River ( in South Korea) or Rimjin River ( in North Korea) is the 7th largest river in Korea. It flows from north to south, crossing the Demilitarized Zone and joining the Han River downstream of Seoul, near the Yellow Sea. The river is not the namesake of the Imjin War (Japanese invasions in the late 16th century).

History 
Imjin River was the site of two major battles: the Battle of Imjin River during the Imjin war in 1592, and the Battle of the Imjin River that took place during the Korean War.

Joint Use Zone
On November 4, 2018, a 20-member team consisting of 10 people from North Korea and 10 people from South Korea began a joint inter-Korean survey intended to lead to the development a Joint Utilization Zone along Imjin River's estuary. The Zone would allow civilians to access the estuary for tourism, ecological protection and the collection of construction aggregate under the protection of militaries from both sides of the Korean border. On November 5, 2018, the councils of South Korea's Gangwon and Gyeonggi provinces, which border the DMZ, signed a “peace working agreement” at Dorasan Station in Paju, giving local approval to the Joint Utilization Zone. The inter-Korean survey of Imjin River's estuary was completed on December 9, 2018. The new map of the river's estuary, which consists of newly discovered reefs, was to be made public by January 25, 2019.

Characteristics 

It gives no indication in normal times of the tremendous power it develops when in flood. During the Korean rainy season of July and August, the Imjin becomes a raging torrent, largely confined by its steep rocky banks. The rapid runoff of approximately 95 percent of precipitation during heavy general rains has caused Imjin, on occasion, to rise at a rate of more than six feet per hour.

During the severe Korean winter, icy winds sweep down the Imjin; the sub-zero temperatures cause thick ice to form on the river. Fluctuations in the level of the river, particularly tidal action in the lower reaches, break up this ice, and large amounts of floe ice pile up against any obstacle in the channel.

Many in South Korea nickname Imjin as the "River of the Dead" as in the past, large numbers of dead bodies have floated down the river from the North. The most recent occurrence was during the major famine of the 1990s when millions of North Koreans are believed to have starved to death.

In popular culture 
In the popular novel MASH: A Novel About Three Army Doctors, the American 4077th Mobile Army Surgical Hospital ("MASH") unit is located close to a branch of the Imjin River.

Imjin River is the subject of a famous North Korean popular song, "Rimjingang", named after the river. It was composed in 1957 with lyrics written by North Korean poet Pak Se-yong. It is a well-known song in North Korea, as it refers to Imjin River as a symbol of freedom flowing from north to south. This song depicts the sadness of a divided homeland and alludes to the infamous history of the river. The song (as "Imujingawa") later became popular in Japan when it was covered by The Folk Crusaders and other artists. It remains popular among Korean communities worldwide, as a song of hope that the Korean people will once again be united and free.

See also 
 Hantan River
 Han River
 List of rivers of Korea
 Hwanggang Dam

References

External links 

 US Army (PDF)
 imjinscout.com

Rivers of South Korea
Rivers of North Korea
International rivers of Asia
North Korea–South Korea border
Biosphere reserves of South Korea